Eduardo Héctor Zarantonello (1918–2010) was an Argentine mathematician working on analysis. His doctorate was awarded by the Universidad Nacional de La Plata.

References

Argentine mathematicians
National University of La Plata alumni
2010 deaths
1918 births